Les géants may refer to:

 Les géants (film), a 2011 film
 Les Géants (novel), a 1973 novel